Clévilliers is a commune in the Eure-et-Loir department and Centre-Val de Loire region of north-central France. It lies 13 km north-west of Chartres and some 80 km west-south-west of Paris.

The Vacheresses stream flows through the commune, which is bordered by Tremblay-les-Villages (north), Challet (east), Berchères-Saint-Germain (south-east), Briconville (south), and Mittainvilliers-Vérigny (south-west).

The eastern border of the Parc naturel régional du Perche, an area of outstanding natural beauty, lies less than 25 km west of Clévilliers

Population

See also
Communes of the Eure-et-Loir department

References

Communes of Eure-et-Loir